Hallowell is a surname. Notable people with the surname include:
Anna Hallowell, (1831–1905), American education reformer
Alfred Irving Hallowell, (1892–1974), American anthropologist
Benjamin Hallowell (disambiguation), multiple people
Christina Hallowell-Garrett
Donald Lee Hallowell (1917-2004), American civil rights lawyer
Edward Hallowell (herpetologist) (1808–1860),  American physician and herpetologist
Edward Hallowell (psychiatrist), American psychiatrist known for his work on attention-deficit hyperactivity disorder.
Edward Needles Hallowell (1836–1871), U.S. Army officer during the American Civil War
Harriet Hallowell (1873–1943), American painter, expatriate, volunteer for the French Red Cross and advocate for Allied prisoners in World War I
Norwood Penrose Hallowell (1839–1914), U.S. Army officer during the American Civil War
Sarah Catherine Fraley Hallowell (1833-1914), American journalist and editor
Sarah Tyson Hallowell (1846–1924), American curator, art agent for the Chicago Art Institute and volunteer for the French Red Cross during World War I